Bojan Spasojević (Serbian Cyrillic: Бојан Спасојевић; born July 26, 1980) is a Serbian footballer.

Career
During his career, he has played for First League of FR Yugoslavia club FK Čukarički, FK Komgrap, Hungarian Zalaegerszegi TE, First League of Serbia and Montenegro club FK Voždovac, Maltese Floriana F.C., Serbian First League clubs FK Metalac Gornji Milanovac and FK Sevojno and Macedonian FK Metalurg Skopje before returning to his hometown club FK Sloga Kraljevo in 2009.

External links
 Profile at Srbijafudbal

1980 births
Living people
Sportspeople from Kraljevo
Serbian footballers
FK Čukarički players
Zalaegerszegi TE players
Expatriate footballers in Hungary
FK Voždovac players
FK Metalac Gornji Milanovac players
FK Sloga Kraljevo players
FK Sevojno players
Floriana F.C. players
Expatriate footballers in Malta
FK Metalurg Skopje players
Expatriate footballers in North Macedonia
FK Kozara Gradiška players
Association football forwards